Yahaya Adoza Bello (born June 18th, 1975) is a Nigerian businessman and politician who has served as the Governor of Kogi State since 2016. A member of the All Progressives Congress, Bello has been the youngest governor in Nigeria throughout his term in office.

Born in Okene, Bello studied accounting and business administration at Ahmadu Bello University before entering the workforce in the mid-2000s. His electoral career began with a loss to Abubakar Audu in the APC gubernatorial primary in 2015 before Audu won the general election; however, Audu died on the day of the election and Bello was selected as his replacement as party nominee and was sworn in the next year. Four years later, he was elected in his own right, albeit amid substantial reports of violence and fraud. His profile has risen rapidly over the course of his term, partly due to his relative youth when compared to other Nigerian politicians along with his controversial statements and questionable expenditures.

Early life and education 
Bello was born June 18th, 1975, in Okene, Kogi State, the youngest of six children. He attended Local Government Education Authority (Nigeria)  (LGEA) Primary School, Agassa in Okene LGA beginning in 1984. He was named as a class prefect of class two and was made the school Head Boy in class six. He attended high school at Agassa Community Secondary School, Anyava, Agassa-Okene and obtained his Junior Secondary School Certificate Examination (JSSCE) and Senior Secondary Certificate Examination (SSCE) certificates from Government Secondary School, Suleja-Niger State in 1994.
Bello studied at Kaduna State Polytechnic Zaria in 1995 and obtained an accounting degree from Ahmadu Bello University in 1999. Yahaya Bello further enrolled for a Masters program in Ahmadu Bello University in Zaria where he was conferred with a Masters degree in Business Administration (MBA) in 2002. Bello became a chartered fellow of the Association of National Accountants of Nigeria in 2004.

Governor Bello is a lover of sport and fitness, especially boxing.

Political career 
Bello was declared winner of the 2015 Kogi gubernatorial election after he was chosen on the platform of the All Progressives Congress as the replacement for the late Abubakar Audu who originally won the election but died before the result was declared. On November 16th, 2019, Bello was elected to a second term after he defeated PDP nominee Musa Wada by over 200,000 votes. Bello is the youngest governor in Nigeria and the only governor to be born after the Nigerian Civil War. Victory Obasi announced in 2020 that she would fund Bello's run in the 2023 presidential elections.  In Abuja on April 2nd, 2022, Bello formally declared his interest to run in Nigeria's presidential elections for 2023. Bello was supported by a socio-political group known as Bello Ambassadors Network founded by Edogbo Anthony. The group had over 2 million registered Nigerians.

Major achievements in office
Immediately, the newly sworn in Governor took to the tasks in sanitizing the Government of kogi state. He sought to streamline government processes and protocols and to recover lost and/or stolen government properties including monies. He also launched the exercise to rid the kogi state civil service of ghost workers. As yahaya Bello arrived the seat of governor, he meet a kogi state that had been poorly managed. Over 1.3million children were reported to be out of school, jobless youths roamed the streets, non - functional hospital and local government areas that have totally collapsed, while the former governor and his cohorts Fed their greed and perfidy. The Yahaya Bello administration was quick to grab the bull by the horns without allowing for the precious time to waste away. He delived into the nitty - gritty to set the committee task force for the recovery of lost and stolen government properties and monies. A committee populated by persons from across party lines. The committee task force was able to discover and recover billions of naira to the state monies that the Governor put to work immediately by reinvesting into the state by erecting lasting infrastructure such as roads [international standards], schools, water treatment plant, hospitals upgrades and refurbishment, agriculture/farming, power and water supply to rural communities, and other critical sectors of the state. On October 21st, 2022 Kogi state has finally joined the league of oil producing state in Nigeria as it received the first derivation allocation from the federal account.its on record that Yahaya Bello Administration has recorded many giant strides in various sectors covering the thematic area.the state allocation came at the time the state government was building legacy project across the state. On December 30th, 2022, president Muhammad Buhari said he was impressed by the performance of Governor yahaya Bello in kogi state, nothing that he had particularly done very well in the area of security and projects execution. President Muhammad Buhari was very impressed by the reference hospital Okene, congratulated yahaya Bello again saying if one wants to see everything here, he will get lost president Muhammad Buhari Commission many projects across the kogi State including the brand new Confluence university of science and technology (CUSTECH) at Osara, Confluence Rice mills at Ejiba and various projects.

Revamping Healthcare
The Yahaya Bello administration in Kogi state launched a major campaign to revamp and upgrade the healthcare delivery system in the state. His administration began with healthcare infrastructure. Within the first four years 400 primary healthcare center were either constructed, renovated upgraded and fully equipped across the rural communities under. Within those years, the Yahaya Bello administration constructed renovated, upgraded and fully equipped secondary healthcare centers such as the general hospitals located across the twenty one 21 local government areas of kogi state ranging from construction of New general hospitals at prince Abubakar Audu university teaching hospital anyigba and remodelled the confluence advanced medical diagnostic and imaging center, lokoja. Under yahaya Bello health intervention initiative, about eight hundred and seventy six 876 surgeries were taken place and over 50000 medical cases were sponsored by the kogi state. The National Population Commission NPC and the federal ministry of health and united nations ranked yahaya Bello administration health care plus with the lowest in fact mortality rates in Nigeria. The Yahaya Bello administration has also building brand new general hospital in Badoko, Ajaokuta and Gega Bilu in kogi state. The Kogi state also renovated and remodelling the specialist hospital, lokoja including construction of brand new ultra modern administration block. Intiatine health insurance scheme with benefits ranging from reduction of patients fees.

On 14th,December 2022 Kogi state has emerged Again as the best performing state in the World Bank-supported Accelerating Nutrition Result In Nigeria (ANRiN) Projects Community -Based Nutrition service Delivery. The kogi state government received the certificate of Achievement as best performing state: Community-Based Nutrition Service Delivery (NSA Performance + DLI) at the 6th ANRIN implementation support event, held in Abuja. The ANRiN Projects supported by the world Bank, is a priority health care project, aimed at increasing the utilisation of quality,cost effective nutrition services for pregnant and lactating women,adolescent girls and children to reduce illnesses and enhance their overall well-being. The kogi state rank as the best among the eleven 11 States including Kogi,ABUJA,Gombe,Kaduna,Kano,Kwara,Nasarawa,Niger,Oyo,Plateau,and Katsina were assessed.

Revolution in road construction
In his five years as the Governor of kogi state, yahaya Bello has constructed over 500 km and has already began the process of constructing more road and flyovers in the rural communities and farmlands. Ongoing road constructed of lokoja road 15.5 km and Idah Road at kogi east is 60.8 km and kabba township roads in kogi state is 95.5 km. The Governor yahaya Bello administration have embarked a major electrification projects in Agasa, Ogori/Banda/Koto and other part of the state to boost economic activities. Yahaya Bello administration constructed the kogi state hause of assembly complex KGHA and the construction of New office for kogi state internal revenue service. The yahaya Bello administration through the ministry of works and housing expended over N26.5billion for the construction of 30 major roads across the state. In order to end the long outstanding issue of lack of portable water in okene yahaya Bello administration embarked on reticulation of the okene mega water work. The yahaya Bello administration has constructed a grade intersection flyover Bridge at Ganaja junction.

Governance through empowerment programs
The yahaya Bello administration under the auspices of the yahaya Bello economic and empowerment formally launched the most successful and sustainable empowerment programs in the history of kogi state. Some of the fruits of the program include the distribution of two hundred commercial buses across the 21 LGAs, distribution of 1800 tricycles, set up a micro grant of 10,000 each petty trade [ women] and founded the micro grant scheme with N300million, launched a N75million keep initiative per each LGAs for youths and women's, another sum of N500million reserved for soft loan to traders and artisans.

Upgrading Education
It is understood, the Governor value education, especially child education. He views child education as a right owed by the government. Under yahaya Bello administration kogi state was ranked the 7th top performer among all the state and fct in Universal Basic education commission UBEC this is as the result of construction of over 375 classroom blocks and renovation of over 700 classrooms blocks across the state.
The Kogi state government spent 1.5billion yearly UBEC counterpart found for four (4) consecutive years totaling 6billion. For the supply of learning aids and ICT centre  built for pupils across the 21 LGAs. Yahaya Bello administration has dropped the percentage of out -of -school -children to single digit. The establishment of the confluence university of science and technology (CUSTECH) osara. And also Health Science And Technology Obangede was granted full accreditation to four years training programs, medical laboratory science, Community Health Extension, Health Information Science and Pharmacy Technicians. For the reason, he made Education one of his priority agenda. So far his government has spent a lot on education, and has also approved payment of NABTEB exams fee for all the 2000 SS3 student f Government Technical College along the state.

Farming
In terms of farming, the yahaya Bello administration had also prioritized agriculture as one of its valued agenda.within the last five years, it procured over 10,000 metric tons of fertilizer for kogi state farmers and has sponsored 2,000 students for farming on better farming mechanisms, over 20,000 farmers were recipients of the fertilizers. The largest Rice milling factory in Northern Nigeria at Ejiba, was established under yahaya Bello administration with the capacity to produce 50 tons of 50 kg rice  and engage 5,000 youths direct and indirect labour. Nursery farms at kaba, lokoja and ochaja have all been established for raising cocoa, cashew and oil palm seedlings for farmers in the state. Over 600 youths were engaged in pruning of 6,510 stands of oil palm trees at Aloma and slashing of 40 hectares of land with N3million investment in Agro-allied companies. The yahaya Bello administration distributed 140 Massey Ferguson tractors to the farmers across the 21 LGAs. The kogi state with the intervention of World Bank has empowered 4000 persons, youths and women in the agro-processing, productivity enhancement and livelihood improvement support (APPEALS) and International Found For Agricultural Development (IFAD) to boost agriculture and food security in the state.

Security
The Kogi state government has over time ensured that the security sector in the state established accountable security institutions which transparently supply security as a public good via. This has led Kogi state government enjoying a peaceful atmosphere as a result of synergy between all the military deployed to the state. Their synergy has rid the state of previously endemic crimes such as kidnapping, banditry, arm robbery and similar social vices. The yahaya Bello administration has constructed operation Base for the Nigeria Army that cost N200million and the logistics of 410 operation vehicles purchased between 2016 and 2017. Trained and recruited 3,000 vigilante corps . Distributed 360 motorcycles and 20 Hilux vans to the vigilante group. Buy 10,000 phones to citizens for Vigiscope for quick emergency reports. 441 youths were engaged in recruitment and training constabulary into the Nigerian Police Force. The yahaya Bello administration has demolished the properties that serve as hideout for criminals and kidnapers in kogi state.

Controversies

Electoral fraud, incitements to violence, and US visa ban 
On the September 14, 2020, Bello was among a list of politicians placed on visa ban by the United States Department of State for undermining democracy in Nigeria. While activists praised the decision and called on other developed nations to impose similar bans, Bello accused the United States of partisanship and claimed the 2019 Kogi State gubernatorial election was mostly peaceful and fair. Despite his claims, the election had significant reports of violence and fraud along with claims that Bello incited the violence with a 'ta-ta-ta-ta' chant that imitated the sound of gunfire.

In 2020, Bello repeated the 'ta-ta-ta-ta' gunfire chant in Akure, Ondo State while addressing a rally for Rotimi Akeredolu's re-election campaign. The chant was condemned by the PDP who then accused Bello of organizing thugs to intimidate Ondo voters. Bello denied the claim and accused the PDP of spreading misinformation.

COVID-19 denial and opposition to vaccines 
At various points during the COVID-19 pandemic, Bello either falsely claimed the virus was 'an artificial creation' or simply denied the virus' existence while his state government suppressed testing and fought with the NCDC to keep case numbers artificially low. Bello also refused to wear a mask at public events, including after a Governors' meeting with President Muhammadu Buhari and at the funeral for Tolulope Arotile. At memorial prayers for Kogi State Chief Judge Nasir Ajanah, who died of COVID-19 on June 28, 2020, Bello falsely claimed that Ajanah had not died of COVID-19 and said "whether medical experts and scientists, believe it or not, COVID-19 is out to shorten the lifestyle of the people, it is a disease propagated by force for Nigerians to accept."

In October 2020, Bello said that he had rejected a ₦1.1 billion support fund for Kogi State from the World Bank because of his belief that COVID-19 is a “glorified malaria”. He also said that “I rejected the World Bank fund because I do not believe in COVID-19. Even the five cases reported in Kogi State is an NCDC creation." This claim was despite his own admission that Kogi State had already received ₦1 billion from the Federal Government for COVID-19 recovery.

In his 2020 New Year's Eve address, Bello dismissed the rising second wave of COVID in Nigeria, saying "we remain determined as a government not to respond to the highly controversial second wave with mass hysteria" and claimed that Kogi was "coronavirus-free." This statement was as Kogi State still was not conducting tests and therefore not finding cases.

Bello opposes vaccinations, contrary to the scientific consensus that vaccines are safe and effective. During the rollout of COVID-19 vaccinations, Bello falsely claimed that vaccine makers “want to...introduce the disease that will kill you, God forbid” and refused to take the COVID-19 vaccine. These comments were shown as an example of purposeful misinformation around vaccines and led to widespread condemnation, including by the Nigeria Governors' Forum.

Fake Honorary Professorship scandal 
In April 2021, Bello claimed to have received a Honorary Professorship in "Humanitarian services, Human Resources Management, Peace Building" from the St Thomas-a-Becket University according to Kogi State Commissioner for Information Kingsley Fanwo. However, investigation by Sahara Reporters found that the St Thomas-a-Becket University neither awards recognised UK degrees nor has any courses in humanitarian services, human resources management, and/or peace building.

Corruption allegations

Security fund and office renovation 
In his first few days as Governor, Bello approved the spending of a total of ₦260 million in security funds in multiple installments. On his first day (January 27, 2016), Permanent Secretary in the Government House Ilemona John requested approval for spending ₦15 million in security funds and Bello approved it two days later; on February 2, John requested approval for another ₦20 million in security funds and Bello approved it on the same day. On February 3, John again requested approval for spending, asking for ₦5 million as the security fund "has just been exhausted" with Bello approving it on the same day. Later on February 3, John asked for ₦20 million to "replenish" the fund and Bello granted immediate approval. Finally, on February 8, John requested ₦100 million twice with Bello immediately approving the spending both times.

Bello also approved over ₦148 million for the furnishing and renovation of the Governor's office at the Government House. On February 1, 2016, John requested approval for ₦99,983,994 for the renovation with Bello immediately approving the spending. The next month, on March 4, John again requested approval for spending, asking for ₦48,593,250 to pay "for additional works on the renovation/furnishing and maintenance of the governor’s office at Kogi Government House." Bello's administration also awarded Maj Global Construction Company a ₦1.4 billion contract for the "Remodelling and Rehabilitation of Government House Structures;" in 2020, Maj Global Construction Company Managing Director Michel Abboud claimed that the Bello administration had not paid ₦726 million despite full completion.

Kogi State Commissioner for Information Kingsley Fanwo claimed the large and rapid spending was needed due to insecurity in Kogi State while the large renovation costs were needed to make the Government House habitable. Fanwo later said, "the Governor Yahaya Bello administration is contractually committed to fighting corruption and enthroning transparency in the polity." In 2020, Fanwo denied that Kogi State owed Maj Global Construction Company any more than ₦100 million.

Budget allocations 
Soon after entering the gubernatorial office in 2016, Bello and his administration was accused of corruption by the socio-political groups, Kogi in Action and Egalitarian Mission for Africa. The groups claimed to have sent information to the EFCC on alleged “fictitious withdrawals and evidence of contracts inflation” by the Bello administration in 2016. Kogi in Action spokesman Majeed Abdullahi said that “EMA furnished the EFCC with details of executive recklessness on the part of the governor and his agents” and expressed concern over the agency's alleged inaction.

In February 2021, scrutiny of the Kogi State Budget 2021 uncovered scores of mentions of COVID-19, a virus Bello falsely claimed did not exist and refused to combat with countermeasures. Not only did the budget mention COVID-19, it allocated billions of naira to various COVID-19 countermeasures from "E-health COVID-19 response" to "e-learning programme (COVID-19 palliative for students in JSS 3 and SSS 3)" along with ₦9.7 billion allocated for simply "COVID-19." Fanwo did not return requests for comment on the budget anomalies as some accused Bello's administration of corruption via the "COVID-19" allocations. In total, at least ₦16.8 billion was allocated to fund COVID-19 countermeasures. Later investigation by the Premium Times showed over ₦2.6 billion was allocated for agriculture-related COVID mitigation programs, however, interviewed farmers claimed that no assistance was offered to them by the state government. Babaniyi Asorose, a farmer and Lokoja coordinator of the All Farmers Association of Nigeria, said that Lokoja seed and fertiliser distribution was discontinued the day after federal Minister of Agriculture Sabo Nanono opened the Kogi State distribution scheme; the warehouse was later raided of all supplies in the midst of the End SARS protests. Asorose, along with other farmers, also denied receiving any state government support and said that much of the supplies that were genuinely distributed were actual given to "political farmers," without actual farms. When submitted with a Freedom of information request, Commissioner for Agriculture David Apeh stated that no government assistance was given to farmers because none of the budgeted money had been spent; when told by the reporter that the audited report indicated that the money had been spent, Apeh deflected saying "it was not from my own office." Commissioner for Finance Asiru Idris, who signed the report, and Bello's Chief Press Secretary Onogwu Mohammed did not respond to requests for comment.

Later in February 2021, the Anti-Corruption Network, a Kogi-based group that had accused Bello of corruption several previous times, released a new report accusing Bello of laundering billions of naira in public funds; the organization then filed a EFCC petition against the governor on March 1. According to former PDP Senator Dino Melaye, the petition was also submitted to the Independent Corrupt Practices Commission, United States embassy, British High Commission, and Transparency International. The report detailed various forms of accused corruption in the 2016, 2017, 2018, and 2019 Kogi State Government Expenditures, including (but not limited to) awarding state contracts to non-legal persons, irregularities in awarding contracts, conflicts of interest in awarding contracts, awarding contracts without due process, and money laundering. The report sparked fresh calls for an EFCC investigation into Bello, including by Kogi anti-corruption groups and the Peoples Democratic Party. The Bello administration responded by calling the allegations politically motivated and claiming the PDP was fearful of Bello's rising profile. On March 30, the EFCC announced an investigation into the Anti-Corruption Network's fraud allegation. However, in July 2021, the Anti-Corruption Network claimed that the EFCC had not made progress on the announced investigation into Bello and threatened to take legal action if the commission did not act promptly.

COVID-19 tracking software 
On March 26, 2021, Premium Times reported that the Kogi State government had spent over ₦90 million on a COVID tracking software that only cost ₦300,000. Reporting revealed that despite the Bello administration's lack of anti-COVID measures, financial records showed that the state government had bought a year of COVID-19 risk assessment software for ₦90,720,000 in March 2020. A reporter posing as a government official who wanted create a similar app in a different state contacted Telnet Technology Limited, the technology company awarded the Kogi project, who stated a similar project would cost only ₦300,000 for one year. Fanwo claimed the project cost less than a million naira but refused to explain why the state financial report showed over ₦90 million being paid for the project. The Premium Times reporting sparked even further calls for investigation, with the Socio-Economic Rights and Accountability Project (SERAP) asking President Buhari to “direct the Attorney General of the Federation and Minister of Justice Abubakar Malami, SAN and appropriate anti-corruption agencies to investigate alleged misuse of the N4.5 billion donations, loans and support the Kogi State government obtained from the Federal Government, including N90,720,000 reportedly spent on software to track COVID-19 cases in the state.

"Kogi State Salary Bailout" Account 
On August 31, 2021, the Lagos Division of the Federal High Court froze the "Kogi State Salary Bailout" Sterling Bank fixed account after an application from the EFCC. The commission's affidavit stated that it had "credible and direct intelligence" that the account was illegally filled with ₦20 billion from a state government loan account on July 25, 2019, and had not been used to pay civil servant salaries. According to the EFCC, in the two years between the account creation and the court date, ₦666,666,666.64 was removed from the account with the commission claiming to be attempting to trace those funds as they were "not used for the payment of the salary." Judge Tijjani Ringim, who granted the commission's motion to freeze the account, stated that the freeze would remain in place until December 1 pending the EFCC investigation and possible prosecution.

In response, Sterling claimed that Kogi State had no fixed account in their bank and said that the account mentioned by the EFCC is an internal digit number the bank uses to manage Kogi State accounts; however, Sterling admitted that there was a similarly numbered fixed account that was not operated by the bank. The Bello administration organized a press conference where Fanwo also claimed that the state government did not have any fixed accounts in Sterling Bank and that the three state government accounts in Sterling Bank only held ₦46 million. Fanwo also accused the EFCC of misleading the judiciary and the public before threatening to sue the commission and media for reporting on the court proceedings. Bello also personally denied the accusations, calling the case a "misrepresentation of facts" along with claiming that no Kogi state account was frozen and that "the officials of the EFCC" could have misled the commission. The EFCC told the Kogi state government to go to court if it contested their findings. Meanwhile, human rights activist Deji Adeyanju said Bello "should be in jail forever" due to corruption and in September 2021, all three of Kogi's senators (Smart Adeyemi, Jibrin Isah, and Yakubu Oseni - all APC) met with EFCC Chairman Abdulrasheed Bawa to advocate for Bello's case. Bawa rebuffed the senators' case after explaining why the EFCC is not solely targeting Kogi; analysts claimed the case could be the biggest test for Bawa since his February 2021 appointment.

In November 2021, the Central Bank of Nigeria acknowledged the receipt of the Kogi State salary bailout funds of about ₦19.3 billion after the recovery of the funds by the EFCC. Fanwo again denied that the money belonged to the Kogi State Government, calling the EFCC's report "mischievous, false and politically motivated." On December 12, the Kogi State Government sued the EFCC for ₦35 billion in damages over the commission's statements on the issue.

Awards and recognitions 
 Torch bearer of security
 Sun Governor of the year (Daily Sun) 
 Gender Equality Award (National council of women Societies)
 NUJ role model award (Nigerian Union of journalists) 
 Icon of security award (Association of people in Diaspora) 
 Security personality of the year (The institute of Security and Strategic studies) 
Distinguished Hero of Women Inclusion Award (National Association of Women Entrepreneurs)
ICAN's Novel Accountability Index Award (The Institute of Chartered Accountants of Nigeria)
Presidential Award for security Management.
World Bank Fiscal Transparency, Revenue Mobilisation Awards
GRAND SERVICE STAR OF RIVERS STATE

See also
List of Governors of Kogi State

References

1975 births
Living people
Nigerian Muslims
All Progressives Congress politicians
Governors of Kogi State
Ahmadu Bello University alumni